Nicholas Lim (born 1 April 2001) is a Hong Kong swimmer. In 2019, he represented Hong Kong at the 2019 World Aquatics Championships in Gwangju, South Korea. He competed in the men's 100 metre butterfly and men's 200 metre butterfly events. He also competed in three relay events.

In 2018, he represented Hong Kong at the 2018 Asian Games held in Jakarta, Indonesia. He competed in the men's 100 metre butterfly and men's 200 metre butterfly events. He also competed in two relay events.

References

Living people
2001 births
Place of birth missing (living people)
Hong Kong male butterfly swimmers
Swimmers at the 2018 Asian Games
Asian Games competitors for Hong Kong
Swimmers at the 2018 Summer Youth Olympics